Ernest "Ernie" Barraclough (birth unknown – death unknown) was an English professional rugby league footballer who played in the 1920s and 1930s.

Background
Ernest Barraclough was born in Ryhill, Wakefield, West Riding of Yorkshire, England.

Playing career

County honours
Ernest Barraclough won caps for Yorkshire while at the Featherstone Rovers; during the 1925–26 season against Cumberland and Lancashire.

County Cup Final appearances
Ernest Barraclough played left-, i.e. number 8, in the Featherstone Rovers' 0-5 defeat by Leeds in the 1928 Yorkshire County Cup Final during the 1928–29 season at Belle Vue, Wakefield on Saturday 24 November 1928.

Club career
Ernest Barraclough made his début for the Featherstone Rovers as a Utility Forward on Saturday 27 August 1921.

References

External links
Search for "Barraclough" at rugbyleagueproject.org

English rugby league players
Featherstone Rovers players
Place of death missing
Rugby league players from Wakefield
Rugby league props
Year of birth missing
Year of death missing
Yorkshire rugby league team players